Lieutenant-General Sir William Pulteney Pulteney,  (18 May 1861 – 14 May 1941) was a British general during the First World War.

Early military career
Educated at Eton College, Pulteney was commissioned into the Oxford Militia in 1878. He transferred to the Scots Guards where he was commissioned a second lieutenant on 23 April 1881.

Anglo-Egyptian War
The following year he served in the Anglo-Egyptian War, where he was present at the Battle of Tell El Kebir (September 1882). On 4 May 1892 he was promoted to captain, and in 1895 he served with the Bunyoro expedition and the Nandi expedition, for which he was mentioned in despatches and was appointed a Companion of the Distinguished Service Order (DSO). Promotion to major followed on 1 May 1897.

Second Boer War
The Second Boer War broke out in October 1899, and Pulteney served with the 1st Battalion of his regiment in South Africa from late 1899, attached to the Guards Brigade, with the brevet appointment as lieutenant-colonel from 11 November 1899. He was present at the battles of Belmont, Enslin and Modder River (November 1899), and the battle of Magersfontein (December 1899). The following year he was appointed second in command of his regiment in April, took part in the march to Bloemfontein and Pretoria, and the battles of Diamond Hill (June 1900), Belfast (August 1900) and the advance to Komatipoort in September. For his service in the war, he received the brevet promotion as colonel on 29 November 1900. He stayed with his regiment in South Africa until the war ended in May 1902, and left for the United Kingdom on the SS Briton two months later.

After the war, he was in charge of the 16th Brigade in Ireland from 1908 and the 6th Division in Ireland in 1910.

First World War

Pulteney had an extensive operational career during the First World War, commanding the III Corps on the Western Front continuously from 31 August 1914 through to 19 February 1918. Pulteney commanded XXIII Corps in the United Kingdom from 20 February 1918 to 15 April 1919.

After the First World War he served with the British Military Mission to Japan, until his retirement in 1920.

Later life
He held the office of 'Black Rod' in the Parliament of the United Kingdom from 1920 to 1941.

Honours
He was created a Knight Commander of the Order of the Bath in 1915; a Knight Commander of the Order of St Michael and St George in 1917, and a Knight Commander of the Royal Victorian Order in 1918.

Personal life
Pulteney was married in 1917 to Jessie, daughter of Sir John Arnott, Baronet.

References

External links
Centre for First World War Studies: William Pulteney Pulteney
Profile at Anglo-Boer War

 

|-

|-

1861 births
1941 deaths
British Army lieutenant generals
Military personnel from Northamptonshire
People educated at Eton College
Scots Guards officers
British Army personnel of the Anglo-Egyptian War
British Army personnel of the Second Boer War
British Army generals of World War I
Knights Commander of the Order of the Bath
Knights Commander of the Order of St Michael and St George
Knights Grand Cross of the Royal Victorian Order
Companions of the Distinguished Service Order
Ushers of the Black Rod
People from North Northamptonshire